Leading Far From A Mistake is the first studio album from Italian Progressive metal band Daedalus.

Compared with the standard features of the genre, this work tries to introduce some original elements, using electronic and ambient music.

Track listing

Credits
Alessio Brunetti – vocals
Andrea Rinaldi – guitar
Fabio Gremo – bass
Giuseppe Spanò – synth
Davide La Rosa – drums

External links
 – Official website
 – Official MySpace page
 – Official Facebook page
 – New LM Records

Daedalus (band) albums
2003 albums